Qalyan Kola (also Romanized as Qalyān Kolā; also known as Qalyān Kolā-ye ‘Olyā) is a village in Dasht-e Sar Rural District, Dabudasht District, Amol County, Mazandaran Province, Iran. At the 2006 census, its population was 300, in 67 families.

References 

Populated places in Amol County